Shooting gallery may refer to:

Firearms and amusements 
Shooting gallery (carnival game), a facility for shooting live firearms or for shooting recreational guns within amusement parks, arcades, carnivals, or fairgrounds
Shooting range, is a specialized facility designed for firearms qualifications, training or practice.

Arts, entertainment, and media

Gaming
 Shooting Gallery (game accessory), light gun accessory and game of the same name for the Magnavox Odyssey home video game console
Shooting gallery game, a video game subgenre of shooter games

Music
 Shooting Gallery (band), a 1990s rock group featuring Andy McCoy
 "Shooting Gallery", a song by 1980s Welsh singer Shakin' Stevens, released as a single from his album This Ole House

Other arts, entertainment, and media
 Shooting Gallery (TV series), a television series on the Outdoor Channel
 TSG Pictures (also known as The Shooting Gallery), a film production company established in 1990 by Bob Gosse

Narcotics
Shooting gallery, a slang term for a: 
 Crack house or heroin den
Supervised injection site